Guatambu is a municipality in the state of Santa Catarina in the South region of Brazil. Its main ethnical compositions are italian, german and cabocla.

See also
List of municipalities in Santa Catarina

References

Populated places established in 1991
1991 establishments in Brazil
Municipalities in Santa Catarina (state)